Liangtian (Xiao'erjing: لِيَانْ‌تِيًا جٍ‎) is a town under the administration of Jinfeng District, Yinchuan, Ningxia, China. , it has one residential community and 8 villages under its administration.

References 

Township-level divisions of Ningxia
Yinchuan